Olenecamptus strigosus is a species of beetle in the family Cerambycidae. It was described by Pascoe in 1866. It is known from Moluccas, Indonesia, and Papua New Guinea.

Subspecies
 Olenecamptus strigosus guadalcanalus Dillon & Dillon, 1948
 Olenecamptus strigosus strigosus Pascoe, 1866

References

Dorcaschematini
Beetles described in 1866